Kevin Michael Birmingham (born October 7, 1971) is an American prelate of the Roman Catholic Church who was named auxiliary bishop for the Archdiocese of Chicago in 2020.

Biography

Early life 
Kevin Birmingham was born on October 7, 1971, in Oak Lawn, Illinois, the seventh of ten children. He attended public primary school in the Chicago Ridge School District in Chicago Ridge, Illinois. Birmingham then entered Quigley Preparatory Seminary South in Chicago. To pay for bus transportation to Quigley, Birmingham worked a paper route and odd jobs.

After graduating from Quigley, Birmingham entered Loyola University Chicago in 1987. He was originally planning to major in computer science but soon decided to enter the priesthood. Birmingham transferred in 1989 to Niles College Seminary at Loyola, graduating in 1993 with a Bachelor of Philosophy degree. Birmingham then attended University of St. Mary of the Lake, obtaining a degree in 1997.

Priesthood 
On May 24, 1997, Birmingham was ordained to the priesthood by Cardinal Francis George. After his ordination, Birmingham traveled to Mexico City, where he celebrated his second mass as a priest at the Basilica of Our Lady of Guadalupe.

Returning to Illinois, Birmingham was assigned as associated pastor for St. Peter Claver Mission Parish in Robbins, Illinois.  He was transferred in 2001 to the same position at St. Benedict Parish in Blue Island, Illinois. In 2001, Birmingham started serving at St. Francis of Assisi Paris in Orland Park, Illinois. In 2005, Birmingham was named pastor of St. Anne Parish in Hazel Crest, Illinois, staying there until 2011. From 2005 to 2009, he also served on the Priests’ Placement Board for the archdiocese.  Birmingham joined the Presbyteral Council in 2006. In 2011, he was appointed pastor of Maternity of the Blessed Virgin Mary Parish in Chicago and in 2013 dean of Deanery III-A.

Episcopal ministry 
Pope Francis appointed Birmingham as an auxiliary bishop for the Archdiocese of Chicago and titular bishop of Dolia on September 11, 2020.  On November 13, 2020, he was consecrated at Holy Name Cathedral in Chicago.

On weekends, Birmingham celebrates mass in Spanish at St. John Berchmans Parish in Chicago.

See also

 Catholic Church hierarchy
 Catholic Church in the United States
 Historical list of the Catholic bishops of the United States
 List of Catholic bishops of the United States
 Lists of patriarchs, archbishops, and bishops

References

External links
Roman Catholic Archdiocese of Chicago Official Site

Episcopal succession

 

1971 births
Living people
People from Oak Lawn, Illinois
21st-century Roman Catholic bishops in the United States
Bishops appointed by Pope Francis